Lohar is a social group in India, Nepal and Pakistan. They are associated with iron smelting work. They form part of a loose grouping of traditionally artisanal castes known as Panchals.

Lohars worship Lord Vishwakarma and other Hindu gods and claim to be Vishwakarma's descendants and considered themselves as vishwakarma brahmin  Lohar caste is included in OBC in different parts of India. Regional synonyms include Vishwakarma and Saifi/Tarkhan (for Muslims).

Names 
Lohar are known by varied surnames in different regions. 
 Assam: Lohar, Karmakar, Vishwakarma
 Andhra Pradesh: VishwaBrahmins,Lohar, Achari, Chary, and Acharya
 Bengal: Lohar, Karmakar, Raut, Majhi, Dandamajhi, Dalui, Sutar
 Bihar and Uttar Pradesh: Lohar‚ Sharma, Vishwakarma and Thakur
 Jammu and Punjab : Lohar, Verma, Tarkhan, Mistri
 Delhi: Lohar, Panchal
 Haryana: Lohar, Dhalwal, Tanwar, Panwar, Solanki, Chauhan, Dangi, Karhera, Dharra, Bhavra, Siwal, Panchal, Bhardwaj, pitlehra
Jharkhand: Lohar
 karnataka : Lohar, kammara, Achari, kambar
 Kerala : Lohar, Achari, Vishwakarma, Ashari, Panjal
 Maharashtra: Lohar, Suryavanshi, Kale, Dharankar, Chavhan, Pawar, Panhalkar, Yande, Borkar, Ghotekar, Manekar, Dhuratkar, Nagare, Thorat, Ingle, Dangre, Upankar, Mane, Ighe, Koshe, Waghodekar, Kumbare, Panvalkar, Dhole, Pakhale. In Konkan Area Shemadkar, Katalkar, Gulekar, Shirvankar, Ghadi, Masurkar, Chaphekar, Masurkar, Pomendkar,
Gujarat: Lohar, Panchal,Makwana, Pitroda, Chitroda, Parmar, Pithva, Suthar, Mistry, Gohil.
 Nepal: Lohar, Vishwakarma (caste)
 Orissa : Lohar, Moharana, Mohapatra, Sutar, Sahu, Parida
 Punjab: Lohar, Saifi/Tarkhan 
 Rajasthan: Lohar, Mistri, Panchal, Suthar
 Tamil Nadu: Lohar, Vishvabrahmins, Kamaalar, Aachari or Aasaari

States

Gujarat

Himachal Pradesh
Tarkhan and Lohar are two castes in Himachal Pradesh. Sikh Lohar are known as Tarkhan. While the Lohar caste has been included in the SC, the Tarkhan caste has been kept on the OBC List. The two castes are the same for all social and matrimonial purposes.

Bihar
 In Bihar Lohar are in list of OBC.

Jharkhand
The Lohar in Jharkhand are a part of the Vishwakarma community.

Madhya Pradesh

The Lohar of Madhya Pradesh are also called Panchal (five sub-castes) since Lohar is one of the five sub-castes of Vishwakarma.

Uttar Pradesh
The Lohar are one of the most widespread OBC communities in Uttar Pradesh. They are divided along religious lines, with the Hindu Lohar known as Vishwakarmas and Muslim Lohars known as Saifis. They are further divided into exogamous groupings, notably the Sharma and Vishwakarma. Most Lohar engage in their traditional occupation of metal fabrication, although the majority of those in western Uttar Pradesh are cultivators. The assimilated Lohar speak Hindi and its various dialects such as Awadhi; others speak Ho. They consider themselves as Vishwabrahmins.

See also
Loarki language
Lahul Lohar language
Lohar Chawl

References

External links

Ethnic groups in Nepal
Ethnic groups in India
Blacksmith castes
Scheduled Castes of Himachal Pradesh
Scheduled Castes of Punjab
Scheduled Tribes of Jharkhand
Scheduled Tribes of Bihar
Other Backward Classes of Haryana
Other Backward Classes of Uttar Pradesh
Other Backward Classes of Chhattisgarh
Other Backward Classes of Rajasthan
Other Backward Classes of Madhya Pradesh
Other Backward Classes of Maharashtra
Other Backward Classes of Bihar